The Combined Arms School or Joint military school, known as École Militaire Interarmes or EMIA, is a military school of the French Army intended to train officers who have risen from the ranks. It was founded in 1942 and based in a rural location, Coëtquidan (Morbihan) along with Saint-Cyr military school.

History
The EMIA is the heir of various military branch (i.e. infantry, cavalry and artillery) schools dating from the early 19th century and intended to train army officers promoted from the ranks (militaires du rang), from non-commissioned officers (sous-officiers) or from the reserves (anciens officiers de réserve). 

The largest of these army branch schools was the infantry school of Saint-Maixent, which was merged with Saint-Cyr in 1942. The merged academies formed the School of Cherchell-Mediouna, created after the German occupation of the Southern Zone of France. In 1944 the Military Academy at Cherchell took the name of "Joint Military Academy." It moved to Coëtquidan, occupying the buildings of the former Academy of Saint-Cyr. These were subsequently destroyed by bombing. 

The new school was reopened in 1947, taking the name of the "Joint Special Military School". Following the principles of amalgamation favoured by its founder, General de Lattre de Tassigny, the school comprised both "direct" officer-cadets entering from civilian life and chosen through external competition; and "semi-direct" officer-cadets selected from serving military personnel. 

This system was retained until 1961, when the training of "direct" officers was transferred to the School of Saint-Cyr, and that of "semi-direct" officers was undertaken by the EMIA. 
Undergraduate students receive a three-year university degree and graduate students receive a one year Master's Degree.

Recruitment and Selection

In the past, candidates were selected at the Ecole Militaire of Strasbourg. The EMS consisted of two branches: the battalion of unique contest Services (CUS) and the pre-competition pack EMIA (PPEMIA). EMS students also had the opportunity to attend a competition for engineers auxiliary armament.
The competition to enter the Ecole Militaire InterArmes :
 be between 23 and 35 years old.
 be baccalaureate.
 be in the Army for at least 3 years, on January 1 of the competition year.
 be physically fit.
Events:
Having entered the competition in his unit, the officer must choose one of three courses for the examination sciences (SI), General Studies (GS), military science (MS). Then, candidates must first pass a series of written tests to qualify and successfully pass a series of oral and physical tests to be admitted.
1. The written test.
2. The oral tests.

Traditions
EMIA students are nicknamed "dolos" after the brand of corned beef of old combat rations. During ceremonies, they wear the parade dress uniform, called "TP" and the curved cavalry saber, representing the future duty as commissioned officers upon graduation. They wear a light blue and red kepi, inherited from the Cherchell Officer Cadet Schoiol.

The songs are EMIA tradition Prayer and Sarie Marès.
A popular phrase:
"One day Dolo, Dolo forever! '

Classes since 1961

See also
 Camp de Coëtquidan
 L'Épaulette magazine
 École nationale des sous-officiers d'active
Ecole de Guerre-Terre (EDG-T), Paris
École spéciale militaire de Saint-Cyr (ESM), Coëtquidan, Brittany
 (EdG) (School of Warfare)
École militaire, Paris
École supérieure de guerre (1876 - 1993)

References

External links 
The prayer (on the website of the Maréchal Bessières promotion)

Training establishments of the French Army
Education in Brittany
Buildings and structures in Morbihan